The Michigan Collegiate Conference (MCC) was an athletic conference that existed in the United States for four seasons, from 1927 through 1931.

History
Formed in December 1926, the members were the Michigan State Normal Hurons (now Eastern Michigan University), the Western State Normal Hilltoppers (now Western Michigan University), the Central State Teachers Chippewas (now Central Michigan University), and the College of the City of Detroit Tartars (now Wayne State University).

Sports sponsored by the MCC included baseball, football, men's basketball, track, and tennis.

The conference disbanded at the 1931 annual meeting. Detroit City College had tendered their resignation due their teams not being strong enough in all sports. The remaining members tried to recruit other colleges but were unsuccessful.

Member schools

Final members

Notes

Individual sports

Football
Michigan State Normal won the football championship from 1927 through 1930, sharing the championship with Western State Teachers College for a co-championship in 1929.

Baseball
Western State Teachers College won the baseball championship four years and tied a fifth year.

Basketball
Detroit City College won the men's basketball championship in 1927–1928, going 18–1 overall, with their sole loss to Manhattan College. Western State won men's basketball championships in 1930, 1931, and 1932.

See also
 List of Michigan Collegiate Conference football standings
 List of defunct college football conferences

References

 
1926 establishments in Michigan
1931 disestablishments in Michigan